DYIC (95.1 FM), broadcasting as 95.1 iFM, is a radio station owned and operated by the Radio Mindanao Network. The station's studio is located at St. Anne Bldg., Luna St., La Paz, Iloilo City, and its transmitter is located along Coastal Rd., Brgy. Hinactacan, La Paz, Iloilo City.

History
DYIC was RMN's seventh FM station in Iloilo, established in 1980 as 95.1 YIC, airing a CHR/Top 40 format together with other RMN FM stations across the country, excluding DWHB in Baguio (which they carrying smooth jazz format) and DYXL in Cebu (which they carrying easy listening format). The station's branding was later changed into 95IC, adapted its tagline "Red Hot Radio" (not to be confused with Real Radio Network's 99.5 RT in Manila).

On August 16, 1992, the station was relaunched as Smile Radio 95.1 and switched to a mass-based format.

On November 23, 1999, it was rebranded as 951 ICFM (pronounced as "nine-five-one") and switched back to its CHR/Top 40 format, with the slogan "Live It Up!".

On May 16, 2002, the station was relaunched once more as 95.1 iFM and bought back its mass-based format. Since late 2011, iFM launched a new slogan called "Ambot sa Kambing na may Bangs!"; thus, this is the only iFM station in the city that currently used as its bumpers.
However, by 2015, the slogan changed to Bestfriend Mo, then Ang Idol kong FM by 2017.

References

Radio stations in Iloilo City
Radio stations established in 1980